Carlos Ramón Aguilar Guifarro (born July 28, 1973) is a Honduran politician. A member of the National Party of Honduras, he represents the Colón Department and is a deputy of 
the National Congress of Honduras for 2006–2010.  His profession is a lawyer.

External links
Profile

Deputies of the National Congress of Honduras
1973 births
Living people
National Party of Honduras politicians
People from Colón Department (Honduras)
21st-century Honduran lawyers